Makeful (formerly known as BiteTV) is a Canadian pay television channel owned by Blue Ant Media.

The channel was first launched on March 5, 2005, as BiteTV, and primarily aired short form programming in the genre of reality, and offered a multi-panel visual format called the "PC Chat 2 Screen". Later, reality programming was dropped, and started showcasing more comedy programming (such as It's Always Sunny in Philadelphia, Jimmy Kimmel Live!, and Warren United). In 2013, the channel started to air more general interest programming (such as Party Down South and Cops). However, on August 24, 2015 the channel relaunched under its current name, and started airing lifestyle programming focusing on do-it-yourself projects such as food, design, style, and crafts in connection with maker culture (from which the channel takes its name), and eventually phased out remaining of its comedy programming. The channel is available to 8.5 million households as of 2013.

History

As BiteTV

In December 2001, Glassbox Television was given approval by the Canadian Radio-television and Telecommunications Commission (CRTC) to launch a Category 2 digital specialty channel tentatively called Short TV, a channel described as "devoted entirely to short form films shot on film, video or created with computer animation. Short TV will showcase Canadian and international cutting edge short form films, from 1 to 40 minutes in length." The channel was originally going to launch in April 2005, but instead launched on March 15, 2005, as BiteTV. The channel used the slogan TV with bite, a variantation based on Showcase's slogan used from the 1990's, Television without borders. At launch, Glassbox Television held 30% of the channel while Astral Media owned 70%.

In May 2006, BiteTV won the Pixel award from the 2006 Canadian New Media Award in the category of Excellence in Cross-Platform. In April 2007, BiteTV won an International Emmy in the category of "Interactive Channel".

On October 1, 2009, an HD feed of Bite was launched. During this time, it was in free preview. In May 2010, Ian Greenberg sold rights to the channel and Astral Media gained full control of Bite. In June 2010, the CRTC gave Glassbox Television approval for an amendment to its nature of service, allowing it to de-emphasize its focus on short-form programming; with the amendment, BiteTV's programming would instead of consisting entirely of short-form programming, must "predominantly" feature such programming. The CRTC also granted BiteTV the ability to add sitcoms and feature films, among other programs.

In response to the CRTC decision, on October 22, 2010, BiteTV underwent a format and logo change, focusing entirely on comedy programming, incorporating sitcoms and feature films to its schedule, including additional sketch comedy and stand-up programs.

On February 13, 2013, another brand refresh for Bite was unveiled, with a new logo and graphics.

In 2013, Bite teamed up with Mondo Media and YouTube to create Bite on Mondo, a program in which content creators pitched ideas for new shows. The pitches are funded through Mondo and use YouTube's popularity to decide whether or not they will be picked up. The winning pitches were broadcast on Bite on August 29, 2014. In October 2014, parent company Blue Ant Media, Mondo Media, and Corus Entertainment announced that Teletoon would air a new series featuring shorts from the program. It was expected to premiere in 2016 on Teletoon at Night, but instead premiered on September 4, 2015, as Night Sweats on Adult Swim.

On-screen and interactive features
Before rebranding as a comedy channel, BiteTV maintained a multi-panel visual format that differed from most other television channels, with content surrounding programs being broadcast on the channel consisting a display of on-air promotions and upcoming shows, a BiteTV office webcam, a status bar to show the remaining time left in the show, and a feature called "The Crawl" that contained pointless facts, weird laws, updates on programming, and the PC Chat 2 Screen function.

The PC Chat 2 Screen was a function created by BiteTV that let viewers interact with the channel and other viewers by letting them comment on what would appear on-air within minutes. As with early user-generated content meant for television (mainly seen then on MTV and Tech TV), it was subject early on to contributions from viewers containing either inappropriate content or spam links which were not vetted before coming to air, requiring BiteTV to institute human and automatic moderation to keep content broadcast-safe.

As Makeful (2015–present)
On August 18, 2015, it was announced that Bite would be rebranded as Makeful, described as "a new lifestyle specialty channel celebrating the maker community and the creation of one-of-a-kind, handmade goods."
The channel relaunched on August 24.

Programming aired on the channel has included Landscape Artist of the Year Canada.

References

External links
 

Blue Ant Media channels
English-language television stations in Canada
Digital cable television networks in Canada
Television channels and stations established in 2005
DIY culture
2005 establishments in Canada